Viscount Gormanston is a title in the Peerage of Ireland created in 1478 and held by the head of the Preston family, which hailed from Lancashire. It is the oldest vicomital title in the British Isles; the holder is Premier Viscount of Ireland.

The Preston family descends from Sir Robert Preston, who served as Lord Chancellor of Ireland. Sometime between 1365 and 1370 he was created Baron Gormanston by writ to the Parliament of Ireland. His son and heir, the second Baron, played a prominent part in public affairs, and was arrested for treason in 1418. His great-grandson, the fourth Baron, served as Lord Deputy of Ireland: in 1478 he was created Viscount Gormanston in the Peerage of Ireland. His son, the second Viscount, served as Lord Justice of Ireland in 1525. A later descendant, the seventh Viscount, was a supporter of King James II and was outlawed after the Glorious Revolution.

Jenico Preston helped to suppress the Irish Rebellion of 1798, and in 1800 he had the outlawry reversed and was summoned to the Irish House of Lords as the twelfth Viscount Gormanston. He was the great-grandson of Anthony Preston, the de jure ninth Viscount Gormanston, the nephew of the seventh Viscount. The twelfth Viscount was succeeded by his son, the thirteenth Viscount. In 1868 he was created Baron Gormanston, in County Meath, in the Peerage of the United Kingdom, which gave the Viscounts an automatic seat in the House of Lords. His son, 
the fourteenth Viscount, notably served as Governor of British Guiana and as Governor of Tasmania. The 15th Viscount was a Captain in the Royal Irish Fusiliers and a Deputy Lieutenant for County Meath.  the titles are held by the latter's great-grandson, the seventeenth Viscount who succeeded to the titles in 1940 at the age of seven months after his father was killed in action during the Battle of France during the Second World War.

Another member of the Preston family was Thomas Preston, 1st Viscount Tara. He was the second son of the fourth Viscount Gormanston. Also, John Preston, 1st Baron Tara, was a descendant of a younger brother.

The unusual first name Jenico  borne by many Preston boys derives from the Gascon-born soldier Sir Jenico d'Artois, a prominent military commander who became a substantial landowner in Ireland. His daughter Jane married the 3rd Baron Gormanston, and was mother of Sir Robert Preston, who was created a viscount.

The family seat was Gormanston Castle, near Drogheda, County Meath.

Barons Gormanston (1365/1370)
Robert Preston, 1st Baron Gormanston (died 1396)
Christopher Preston, 2nd Baron Gormanston (died 1422)
Christopher Preston, 3rd Baron Gormanston (died 1450)
Robert Preston, 4th Baron Gormanston (died 1503; created Viscount Gormanston in 1478)

Viscounts Gormanston (1478)
Robert Preston, 1st Viscount Gormanston (1435–1503)
William Preston, 2nd Viscount Gormanston (died 1532); only son of the 1st Viscount
Jenico Preston, 3rd Viscount Gormanston (1502–1569); only son of the 2nd Viscount
Christopher Preston, 4th Viscount Gormanston (1546–1599); eldest son of the 3rd Viscount
Jenico Preston, 5th Viscount Gormanston (1584–1630); eldest son of the 4th Viscount
Nicholas Preston, 6th Viscount Gormanston (1608–1643); only son of the 5th Viscount
Jenico Preston, 7th Viscount Gormanston (died 1691) (outlawed 1691); eldest son of the 6th Viscount
Jenico Preston, de jure 8th Viscount Gormanston (1640–1700); eldest son of 2nd (and youngest) son of the 6th Viscount
Anthony Preston, de jure 9th Viscount Gormanston (died 1716); only brother of the  de jure 8th Viscount
Jenico Preston, de jure 10th Viscount Gormanston (1707–1757); only son of  de jure 9th Viscount
Anthony Preston, de jure 11th Viscount Gormanston (1736–1786); eldest son of the  de jure 10th Viscount
Jenico Preston, 12th Viscount Gormanston (1775–1860) (restored 1800); only son of the de jure 11th Viscount
Edward Anthony John Preston, 13th Viscount Gormanston (1796–1876); eldest son of the 12th Viscount
Jenico William Joseph Preston, 14th Viscount Gormanston (1837–1907); eldest son of the 13th Viscount
Jenico Edward Joseph Preston, 15th Viscount Gormanston (1879–1925); eldest son of the 14th Viscount
Jenico William Richard Preston, 16th Viscount Gormanston (1914–1940); eldest son of the 15th Viscount; killed in action, France, World War II
Jenico Nicholas Dudley Preston, 17th Viscount Gormanston (born 1939); only son of the 16th Viscount
The heir apparent is the present Viscount's elder son Hon. Jenico Francis Tara Preston (born 1974)
The heir-in-line is Hon. Jenico Preston's son, (Jenico Bertram Nicholas) Alfred Preston, born 2016).

See also
Baron Tara
Viscount Tara
Gormanston, County Meath

References

External links

Kidd, Charles, Williamson, David (editors); Debrett's Peerage and Baronetage (1990 edition). New York: St Martin's Press, 1990.
Tiernan, Sonja, ‘“A Zealous Catholic and a Notorious Trouble-Maker” The Gormanston Papers in the National Library of Ireland’ in Ríocht na Mídhe: Meath Archæological and Historical Society. Vol. XX, 2009, pp. 171–88.
Catalogue for Gormanston Estate Papers at National Library of Ireland, qv. www.nli.ie
Burke's Peerage & Baronetage

Viscountcies in the Peerage of Ireland
Noble titles created in 1478